This is a list of women photographers who were born in the Netherlands or whose works are closely associated with that country.

A
 Emmy Andriesse (1914–1953), noted for her clandestine photography of the Netherlands under Nazi rule
 Maria Austria (1915–1975), theatre and documentary photographer

B
 Katharina Behrend (1888–1973), German-born Dutch amateur photographer, wide variety of genres including a nude self-portrait
 Eva Besnyö (1910–2002), Dutch-Hungarian photographer active in the Dutch "New Photography" movement
 Ania Bien (born 1946)
 Lucie Blachet (1828–1907), early female photographer
 Sacha de Boer (born 1967), portrait-, travel-, and documentary photographer 
 Melanie Bonajo (born 1978) (active since 2007), contemporary artist, photographer
 Marrie Bot (born 1946), pilgrimages, mentally handicapped, multicultural funeral and mourning rituals

C
 Violette Cornelius (1919–1997), photographer, resistance fighter

D
 Rineke Dijkstra (born 1959), portraits of adolescents
 Desiree Dolron (born 1963), documentary, still life, portrait and architectural photographer

E
 Angèle Etoundi Essamba (born 1962), Cameroonian-born photographer based in Amsterdam

G
 Margi Geerlinks (born 1970), photographer
 Sophia Goudstikker (1865–1924), Dutch-German feminist and photographer

H
 Jacqueline Hassink (1966–2018), visual artist, noted for her Table of Power projects related to the world economy; also lectures on photography
Maria Hille (1827–1893), first professional female photographer in the Netherlands

K
 Ata Kandó (1913–2017), noted for her Dream in the Wood fantasy photos, Hungarian refugee photos and Amazonian indigenous images

L
 Ine Lamers (born 1954), photographer, video installation artist
 Inez van Lamsweerde (born 1963), fashion photographer
 Dana Lixenberg (born 1964), portrait photographer

M
 Awoiska van der Molen (born 1972)
 Bertien van Manen (born 1942), documentary photographer
 Hellen van Meene (born 1972), portrait photographer
 Maria Antonia Merkelbach (1904–1985), professional photographer in Amsterdam
 Awoiska van der Molen (born 1972), black and white landscape photographer

P
 Carla van de Puttelaar (born 1967), fine art photographer
Charlotte Pothuis (1867–1945), co-owner of Dames Sluijter & Boom in Amsterdam

S
 Viviane Sassen (born 1972), fine art and fashion photographer
 Renée Scheltema (born 1951), documentary filmmaker, photographer
 Margriet Smulders (born 1955), flower photographer
 Ellen Spijkstra (born 1957), nature photographer
 Annemarie Spilker (born 1980), self-portraits, landscapes

T
 Alexine Tinne (1835–1869), first female photographer in the Netherlands, produced large images in The Hague

W
 Marijke van Warmerdam (born 1959), photographer, installation artist
 Ans Westra (1936–2023), see New Zealand
 Annemie Wolff (1906–1994), German-Dutch photographer, photographed Jewish children and adults in 1943

Z
 Flore Zoé (born 1975), fine art and fashion photographer

See also
 List of women photographers

-
Dutch women photographers, List of
Photographers, List of French
Photographers